Admiral Radhakrishna Hariram Tahiliani, PVSM, AVSM (12 May 1930 – 14 October 2015) was a Flag officer in the Indian Navy. He served as the 12th Chief of the Naval Staff from 1 December 1984 until 30 November 1987. His prior commands included those as the Flag Officer Commanding-in-Chief (FOC-IN-C) of the Western Naval Command, FOC-IN-C of the Southern Naval Command and Flag Officer Commanding Western Fleet (FOCWF). A carrier-based aircraft pilot, he also served as the commanding officer of the aircraft carrier, .

After retirement, Tahiliani served as the Governor of Sikkim from 1990 to 1994. He was a founder member and chairman of the India chapter of Transparency International (TI). He also served on the board of TI.

Naval career
Tahiliani was commissioned into the Indian Navy on 1 September 1950, and was confirmed as a sub-lieutenant on 17 May 1952. He joined the Indian Naval Air Arm and qualified as a pilot for carrier-based aircraft. He was a graduate of the Naval War College, United States and the National Defence College, New Delhi. He also qualified as a test pilot.

He served as a carrier-based strike pilot on board INS Vikrant; following his promotion to captain on 31 December 1970, he commanded its carrier borne squadron during the Indo-Pakistan War of 1971.

Flag rank 
Promoted to acting rear admiral on 30 December 1977, he was appointed Flag Officer, Goa Area (FOGA), with promotion to substantive rear admiral on 1 February 1978. Later, he was appointed the Flag Officer Commanding Western Fleet (FOCWF).

His next appointment was as Assistant Chief of the Naval Staff (ACNS) at Naval Headquarters (NHQ). This was followed by appointment as the Deputy Chief of the Naval Staff (DCNS). He was promoted to Vice Admiral while in this office. In February 1982, then vice admiral, Tahiliani was appointed the Flag Officer Commanding-in-Chief (FOC-IN-C) Southern Naval Command. In March 1983, he was appointed the Flag Officer Commanding-in-Chief Western Naval Command. In May 1984, he was appointed the Vice Chief of the Naval Staff (VCNS).

On 1 December 1984, he took over as the Chief of the Naval Staff (CNS) of the Indian Navy.

Tahiliani retired from the Indian Navy on 30 November 1987.

Later career

Tahiliani served as the Governor of Sikkim between 8 February 1990 and 20 September 1994.

He helped launch the India chapter of Transparency International as a founder member in 1997. He served as the chairman of the India chapter practically from its founding until 2010 and was chairperson of Balvantray Mehta Vidya Bhawan Anguridevi Shersingh, a senior secondary school located in the South District of New Delhi, India.

Tahiliani was elected to the board of Transparency International in 2002.

Personal life
Tahiliani was married to Jaswanti Tahiliani. His wife was the first female engineer in Mumbai. He is the father of noted Indian fashion designer, Tarun Tahiliani, and executive director of Ensemble India, Tina Tahiliani Parikh. He died on 14 October 2015.

Awards and decorations
Admiral Tahiliani was awarded the Ati Vishisht Seva Medal and the Param Vishisht Seva Medal for his distinguished service.

References

1930 births
Chiefs of the Naval Staff (India)
Vice Chiefs of Naval Staff (India)
Deputy Chiefs of Naval Staff (India)
Flag Officers Commanding Western Fleet
Indian Navy admirals
Governors of Sikkim
2015 deaths
Sindhi people
Recipients of the Param Vishisht Seva Medal
Indian naval aviators
Naval War College alumni
National Defence College, India alumni
Recipients of the Ati Vishisht Seva Medal